Lanelle Olandrea Tanangada (born 1 July 1979) is a Solomon Islands teacher and politician who has served as the country's Education Minister since April 2020.

Early life and education
Lanelle Oleandra Tanangada was born on 1 July 1979 in Western Province. Her father is part Ranongga and Vella and her mother is from Marovo Lagoon. Her parents were Seventh-day Adventist missionaries and she has one elder brother. She attended SDA mission primary schools in Honiara and Betikama Adventist High School.

Tanangada undertook undergraduate studies at the Pacific Adventist University in Papua New Guinea and received a Master of Education from the University of Waikato in New Zealand in 2013, with a thesis titled A study of language use in secondary school classrooms in the Solomon Islands: Conceptions, practices and proficiencies. She was a teacher at SDA schools in Kukudu, Burns Creek and Betikama.

Political career
Tanangada was elected as the independent representative for Gizo/Kolombangara constituency in a May 2018 by-election after her husband Jimson Tanangada lost the seat after being convicted of bribing voters during the 2014 election. The charges were brought by former Prime Minister Gordon Darcy Lilo, who then contested the seat. Tanangada defeated Lilo with 2580 votes to his 1593. She was the first woman in the Western Province elected to the Parliament and the fourth woman MP in the country's history. On 18 October 2019, she was sworn in as Minister for Women, Youth and Children Affairs.

Tanangada joined the Kadere Party and became part of the Democratic Coalition Government for Advancement. She was re-elected for a full term in the April 2019 elections, again defeating Lilo with 4397 votes to his 4002. She became one of only two women in the 50-seat Parliament. She was appointed Minister for Police, National Security and Correctional Services, a position she resigned from in October 2019. In April 2020, she became Minister for Education and Human Resources Development under Prime Minister Manasseh Sogavare.

Personal life
Tanangada is married to Jimson Tanangada and they have two children. She is a Christian.

References

External links
 Parliamentary profile
 Ministry of Education

Living people
1979 births
University of Waikato alumni
Women government ministers of the Solomon Islands
Education ministers of the Solomon Islands